Qaleh Now (also Romanized as Qal‘eh Now) is a village in Jalilabad Rural District, Jalilabad District, Pishva County, Tehran Province, Iran. At the 2006 census, its population was 646, in 146 families.

References 

Populated places in Pishva County